Günther Herrmann (born 11 September 1939) is a German former football who was capped nine times for the West Germany national team.

He started his club career with Eintracht Trier (1956–1958) and Karlsruher SC (1958–1963). He moved to Schalke 04 for the 1963–64 season and made 110 league appearances for them over the next four seasons.  He returned to Karlsruher SC for 1967–68, and then moved to FC Sion (1968–1975).

Herrmann was a member of the German squad at the 1962 FIFA World Cup.

References

External links
 

1939 births
Living people
Sportspeople from Trier
German footballers
Association football midfielders
Germany international footballers
1962 FIFA World Cup players
Bundesliga players
SV Eintracht Trier 05 players
Karlsruher SC players
FC Schalke 04 players
FC Sion players
German expatriate footballers
German expatriate sportspeople in Switzerland
Expatriate footballers in Switzerland
Footballers from Rhineland-Palatinate